The Magic 8 Ball is a plastic sphere, made to look like an oversized  , that is used for fortune-telling or seeking advice. It was invented in 1946 by Albert C. Carter and Abe Bookman and is currently manufactured by Mattel. The user asks a yes–no question to the ball, then turns it over to reveal an answer in a window on the ball.

Origin
The functional component of the Magic 8 Ball was invented by Albert C. Carter, who was inspired by a spirit writing device used by his mother Mary, a Cincinnati clairvoyant. When Carter approached store owner Max Levinson about stocking the device, Levinson called in Abe Bookman, Levinson's brother-in-law, and graduate of Ohio Mechanics Institute. In 1944, Carter filed for a patent for the cylindrical device, assigning it in 1946 to Bookman, Levinson and another partner in what came to be Alabe Crafts, Inc., combining the founder's names, Albert and Abe. Alabe marketed and sold the cylinder as The Syco-Slate. Carter died sometime before the patent was granted in 1948. Bookman made improvements to The Syco-Slate, and in 1948 it was encased in an iridescent crystal ball. Though not successful, the revamped product caught the attention of Chicago's Brunswick Billiards, who in 1950 commissioned Alabe Crafts to make a version in the form of a traditional black-and-white 8 ball, which was possibly inspired by a gag in the 1940 Three Stooges short film, You Nazty Spy!.

Cultural impact

Although originally sold as a paperweight, the Magic 8 Ball would remain popular for several decades. It was popular as both an office toy and a children's toy.

In 1971, Bookman sold Alabe Crafts, Inc., to Ideal Toys who marketed the ball firmly at children. In 1987, the rights were again sold to Tyco Toys, spurring on another marketing campaign and resurgence in interest. Tyco Toys was acquired by Mattel, the current manufacturer, in 1997. Despite its numerous owners, the Magic 8 Ball has changed little in design and implementation.

Design and usage

The Magic 8 Ball is a hollow plastic sphere resembling a black-and-white 8 ball. Its standard size is larger than an ordinary pool ball, but it has been made in different sizes. Each of the die's 20 faces has an affirmative, negative, or non-committal statement printed in raised letters. These messages are read through a window on the ball's bottom.

To use the ball, it must be held with the window initially facing down to allow the die to float within the cylinder. After asking the ball a yes–no question, the user then turns the ball so that the window faces up. The die floats to the top, and one face presses against the window; the raised letters displace the blue liquid to reveal the message as white letters on a blue background. Although most users shake the ball before turning it upright, the instructions warn against doing so to avoid white bubbles.

While the Magic 8 Ball has undergone very few changes, an addition in 1975 by new owners, Ideal Toy Company, fixed the bubble problem. Their patented "Bubble Free Die Agitator", an inverted funnel, rerouted the air trapped inside. The solution has been utilized ever since.

Possible answers
A standard Magic 8 Ball has twenty possible answers, including ten affirmative answers (●), five non-committal answers (●), and five negative answers (●).

See also

Patents 

 —Liquid Filled Dice Agitator ca. 1944
—Liquid filled die agitator containing a die having raised indicia on the facets thereof, 1962
—Amusement Device ca. 1961

References

External links

 

Products introduced in 1946
Cue sports toys and games
Divination software and games
Novelty items
Mattel
1940s toys
1950s toys
1960s toys
1970s toys
1980s toys
1990s toys
2000s toys
2010s toys